Bhatt Gayand was a Brahmin bard in the court of Guru Arjan, whose 13 hymns are present in Guru Granth Sahib, the sacred scripture of the Sikhs.

References

Sikh Bhagats